The Garden City Formation is a geologic formation in Idaho. It preserves fossils dating back to the Ordovician period.

See also

 List of fossiliferous stratigraphic units in Idaho
 Paleontology in Idaho

References
 

Ordovician Idaho
Ordovician geology of Utah
Ordovician southern paleotropical deposits